The 1975–76 Bundesliga was the 13th season of the Bundesliga, West Germany's premier football league. It began on 9 August 1975 and ended on 12 June 1976. Borussia Mönchengladbach were the defending champions.

Competition modus
Every team played two games against each other team, one at home and one away. Teams received two points for a win and one point for a draw. If two or more teams were tied on points, places were determined by goal difference and, if still tied, by goals scored. The team with the most points were crowned champions while the three teams with the fewest points were relegated to their respective 2. Bundesliga divisions.

Team changes to 1974–75
VfB Stuttgart, Tennis Borussia Berlin and Wuppertaler SV were relegated to the 2. Bundesliga after finishing in the last three places. They were replaced by Hannover 96, winners of the 2. Bundesliga Northern Division, Karlsruher SC, winners of the Southern Division and Bayer 05 Uerdingen, who won a two-legged promotion play-off against FK Pirmasens.

Team overview

Notes
The VfL Bochum played six of their 1976 home games at Stadion am Schloss Strünkede in Herne and one at the Westfalenstadion in Dortmund because the field at their Stadion an der Castroper Straße had become unplayable due to the 1976–1979 expansion of the stadium.

League table

Results

Top goalscorers
29 goals
  Klaus Fischer (FC Schalke 04)

23 goals
  Erich Beer (Hertha BSC)
  Gerd Müller (FC Bayern Munich)

22 goals
  Klaus Toppmöller (1. FC Kaiserslautern)

18 goals
  Horst Hrubesch (Rot-Weiss Essen)

17 goals
  Roland Sandberg (1. FC Kaiserslautern)

16 goals
  Wolfgang Frank (Eintracht Braunschweig)
  Bernd Hölzenbein (Eintracht Frankfurt)
  Allan Simonsen (Borussia Mönchengladbach)

15 goals
  Johannes Löhr (1. FC Köln)
  Bernd Nickel (Eintracht Frankfurt)

Champion squad

See also
 1975–76 2. Bundesliga
 1975–76 DFB-Pokal

References

External links
 DFB Bundesliga archive 1975/1976

Bundesliga seasons
1
Germany